Look How Long is the fifth and final studio album by British contemporary R&B group Loose Ends; released on 13 November 1990 via 10 Records (which was distributed via Virgin Records) in the United Kingdom and MCA Records in the United States. The album peaked at #124 on the Billboard 200 and #28 on the Billboard R&B chart in 1990. Produced by band member Carl McIntosh, it is the only album from the band to not feature original members Jane Eugene and Steve Nichol; they both left the band following their previous album The Real Chuckeeboo and were subsequently replaced by Linda Carriere and Sunay Suleyman both contributing singers & songwriter on the album.

Three singles were released from Look How Long: "Don't Be a Fool", "Cheap Talk" and "Love's Got Me". "Don't Be a Fool" was the most successful single from the album, peaking at #10 on the Billboard R&B chart in 1990.

Track listing

Charts

Weekly charts

Year-end charts

References

External links
 
 

1990 albums
Loose Ends (band) albums
MCA Records albums
Virgin Records albums